Daniel Eugene Martinez (born June 14, 1985) is an American mixed martial artist who competes in the flyweight division of Taura MMA. A professional mixed martial artist since 2006, Martinez has also competed in the Ultimate Fighting Championship and Absolute Championship Berkut.

Biography

Education
Martinez wrestled at Marcos de Niza High School and then attended Pima Community College where he wrestled and trained with the likes of Efrain Escudero, Jamie Varner, and Anthony Birchak.

Early MMA career
A native Arizonan, Martinez began his mixed martial arts career in 2006, competing first at lightweight and then featherweight in regional promotions, primarily across the Southwestern United States. Martinez faced former UFC title challenger Mark Hominick in 2008, where Hominick defeated Martinez via unanimous decision. Martinez compiled a professional record of 11–2, before facing Joseph Benavidez in a bantamweight bout on December 3, 2008 at WEC 37.  Benavidez defeated Martinez via unanimous decision.

Over the next few years, Martinez dropped in weight class to the flyweight division, and also had a brief stint on The Ultimate Fighter 18. Martinez was defeated in an elimination bout by future finalist, Davey Grant.

Ultimate Fighting Championship
On the heels of a 6–1 run for regional promotions, Martinez signed with the UFC in January 2014. He made his promotional debut as a short notice replacement, filling in for Kyoji Horiguchi against Chris Cariaso on February 1, 2014 at UFC 169. Cariaso defeated Martinez via unanimous decision.

Martinez faced Scott Jorgensen on June 7, 2014 at UFC Fight Night 42. Jorgensen defeated Martinez via unanimous decision.  Their performance earned both participants Fight of the Night honors.

Martinez faced promotional newcomer Sirwan Kakai in a bantamweight bout on June 27, 2015 at UFC Fight Night 70.  Martinez lost the fight via unanimous decision.

Martinez face Richie Vaculik on November 15, 2015 at UFC 193. He won the fight via unanimous decision.

Absolute Championship Berkut
Martinez faced Darren Mima on January 13, 2017 at ACB 51. He won the fight by unanimous decision.

Amassing a record of 2–2 after his UFC release, Martinez signed a contract with Taura MMA.

Championships and Accomplishments 
 Ultimate Fighting Championship
 Fight of the Night (One time)

Mixed martial arts record

|-
|Loss
|align=center|21–9
|Ali Bagautinov
|Decision (unanimous)
|Fight Nights Global 76: Bagautinov vs. Martinez
|
|align=center|5
|align=center|5:00
|Krasnodar, Russia
|
|-
|Loss
|align=center|21–8
|Hiromasa Ougikubo
|Decision (unanimous)
|Shooto – Professional Shooto 4/23
|
|align=center|3
|align=center|5:00
|Urayasu, Japan
|
|-
| Win
| align=center| 21–7
| Darren Mima
| Decision (unanimous)
| |ACB 51: Silva vs. Torgeson
| 
| align=center| 3
| align=center| 5:00
| Irvine, California, United States
|
|-
| Win
| align=center| 20–7
| Benjamin Vinson
| Decision (unanimous)
| Combate Americas – Combate Ocho
| 
| align=center| 3
| align=center| 5:00
| Los Angeles, California, United States
|
|-
| Win
| align=center| 19–7
| Richie Vaculik
|  Decision (unanimous)
| UFC 193
| 
| align=center| 3
| align=center| 5:00
| Melbourne, Australia
|
|-
| Loss
| align=center| 18–7
| Sirwan Kakai
| Decision (unanimous)
| UFC Fight Night: Machida vs. Romero
| 
| align=center| 3
| align=center| 5:00
|Hollywood, Florida, United States
|
|-
| Loss
| align=center| 18–6
| Scott Jorgensen
| Decision (unanimous)
| UFC Fight Night: Henderson vs. Khabilov
| 
| align=center| 3
| align=center| 5:00
| Albuquerque, New Mexico, United States
| 
|-
| Loss
| align=center| 18–5
| Chris Cariaso
| Decision (unanimous)
| UFC 169
| 
| align=center| 3
| align=center| 5:00
| Newark, New Jersey, United States
|
|-
| Win
| align=center| 18–4
| Ian Dela Cuesta
| Decision (unanimous)
| Coalition of Combat: Free 4 All
| 
| align=center| 3
| align=center| 5:00
| Phoenix, Arizona, United States
|
|-
| Win
| align=center| 17–4
| Richie Bonafidini
| TKO (punches)
| Xplode Fight Series: Disarm
| 
| align=center| 1
| align=center| 2:33
| Valley Center, California, United States
|
|-
| Win
| align=center| 16–4
| Nick Boyd
| TKO (punches)
| Xplode Fight Series: Brutal Conduct
| 
| align=center| 1
| align=center| 1:49
| Valley Center, California, United States
|
|-
| Win
| align=center| 15–4
| Eduardo Espinosa
| Decision (unanimous)
| Ultimate Warrior Challenge Mexico 9: They're Back
| 
| align=center| 3
| align=center| 5:00
| Tijuana, Mexico
|
|-
| Loss
| align=center| 14–4
| Jussier Formiga
| Decision (unanimous)
| Tachi Palace Fights 7
| 
| align=center| 3
| align=center| 5:00
| Lemoore, California, United States
| 
|-
| Win
| align=center| 14–3
| Nick Honstein
| TKO (punches)
| King of Champions: Night of Champions
| 
| align=center| 2
| align=center| 2:06
| Denver, Colorado, United States
|
|-
| Loss
| align=center| 13–3
| Joseph Benavidez
| Decision (unanimous)
| WEC 37
| 
| align=center| 3
| align=center| 5:00
| Las Vegas, Nevada, United States
|
|-
| Win
| align=center| 13–2
| Joey Marimberga
| Submission (rear-naked choke)
| Evolution MMA
| 
| align=center| 3
| align=center| 3:19
| Phoenix, Arizona, United States
|
|-
| Win
| align=center| 12–2
| Justin Cruz
| TKO (doctor stoppage)
| Total Combat 31
| 
| align=center| 2
| align=center| 4:27
| Yuma, Arizona, United States
|
|-
| Win
| align=center| 11–2
| Felipe Chavez
| Submission (guillotine choke)
| Rage in the Cage 113
| 
| align=center| 1
| align=center| 2:07
| Albuquerque, New Mexico, United States
|
|-
| Loss
| align=center| 10–2
| Adrian Woolley
| Decision (unanimous)
| TKO 34
| 
| align=center| 5
| align=center| 5:00
| Montreal, Quebec, Canada
| 
|-
| Win
| align=center| 10-1
| Johan Croes
| TKO (punches)
| TKO 33
| 
| align=center| 3
| align=center| 3:00
| Oranjestad, Aruba
|
|-
| Win
| align=center| 9–1
| Justin Goodall
| KO (punches and elbows)
| Xtreme FC 3: Rage in the Cage
| 
| align=center| 2
| align=center| 1:43
| Tampa, Florida, United States
| 
|-
| Loss
| align=center| 8–1
| Mark Hominick
| Decision (unanimous)
| TKO 31
| 
| align=center| 3
| align=center| 5:00
| Montreal, Quebec, Canada
|
|-
| Win
| align=center| 8–0
| Derithe Harper
| Decision (split)
| Rage in the Cage 102
| 
| align=center| 3
| align=center| 3:00
| Tucson, Arizona, United States
|
|-
| Win
| align=center| 7–0
| Billy Kidd
| Submission (rear-naked choke)
| EC Fights
| 
| align=center| 3
| align=center| N/A
| Monterrey, Mexico
| 
|-
| Win
| align=center| 6–0
| Kavi Cermak
| Decision (unanimous)
| Rage in the Cage 91
| 
| align=center| 3
| align=center| 3:00
| Phoenix, Arizona, United States
|
|-
| Win
| align=center| 5–0
| Yasha Tabrizy
| TKO (punches)
| Rage in the Cage 89
| 
| align=center| 2
| align=center| 1:26
| Fountain Hills, Arizona, United States
|
|-
| Win
| align=center| 4–0
| Daniel Hinsen
| Submission (guillotine choke)
| Rage in the Cage 88
| 
| align=center| 1
| align=center| 0:44
| Tucson, Arizona, United States
|
|-
| Win
| align=center| 3–0
| Cameron Mayer
| TKO (injury)
| Rage in the Cage 85
| 
| align=center| 2
| align=center| 3:00
| Phoenix, Arizona, United States
|
|-
| Win
| align=center| 2–0
| Greg Saenz
| Decision (split)
| Rage in the Cage 84
| 
| align=center| 3
| align=center| 3:00
| Phoenix, Arizona, United States
|
|-
| Win
| align=center| 1–0
| Tim Goodwin
| TKO (punches)
| Universal Fight Promotions: Supremacy
| 
| align=center| 1
| align=center| 2:31
| Carlsbad, New Mexico, United States
|

See also
 List of current UFC fighters
 List of male mixed martial artists

References

External links
 
 

1985 births
Living people
Sportspeople from Tempe, Arizona
American male mixed martial artists
Flyweight mixed martial artists
Mixed martial artists utilizing collegiate wrestling
Mixed martial artists from Arizona
Ultimate Fighting Championship male fighters